The 1896 Melbourne Cup was a two-mile handicap horse race which took place on Tuesday, 3 November 1896.

Marius Sestier filmed the Melbourne Cup. The feature, which consisted of 10 one-minute films shown in chronological order, was premiered at the Princess Theatre, Melbourne on 19 November 1896.

The placegetters were:

See also

 Melbourne Cup
 List of Melbourne Cup winners
 Victoria Racing Club

References

External links

1896
Melbourne Cup
Melbourne Cup
19th century in Melbourne
1890s in Melbourne